Povlje is a small village below Mount Storžič in the Municipality of Kranj in the Upper Carniola region of Slovenia.

Gallery

References

External links
Povlje on Geopedia

Populated places in the City Municipality of Kranj